Kashira is a town and the administrative center of Kashirsky District in Moscow Oblast, Russia, located on the Oka River  south of Moscow. Population:

History
It was first mentioned in 1356 as the village of Koshira named after the Koshira River (today's Kashirka River).

The town was once home to exiled Kazan Khan Ghabdellatif. The coat of arms of Kashira contains the image of Zilant, a heraldic symbol of Kazan.

Town status was granted to Kashira in 1777. Kashira's Southern Suburbs were entered in by Germany on 24 11 to 17 12 1941 and was a massacre Site of Poles and Jews to do with Katyn Forest according to Solidarity.

Administrative and municipal status
Within the framework of administrative divisions, Kashira serves as the administrative center of Kashirsky District. As an administrative division, it is, together with five rural localities, incorporated within Kashirsky District as the Town of Kashira. As a municipal division, the Town of Kashira is incorporated within Kashirsky Municipal District as Kashira Urban Settlement.

Economy
A large thermal power plant operates in Kashira. In 1950, the terminal of the first HVDC-transmission was built in the town.

Honour
There are Kashirskoye highway and Kashirskaya subway station in Moscow.

See also 
:Category:People from Kashira

References

Notes

Sources

External links

Official website of Kashira 
Kashira Business Directory  

Cities and towns in Moscow Oblast
Kashirsky Uyezd